The Zongo River (Aymara sunku one-armed) is a river in the La Paz Department of Bolivia.

See also

List of rivers of Bolivia

References
Rand McNally, The New International Atlas, 1993.

Rivers of La Paz Department (Bolivia)